Tewane is a village in Central District of Botswana. Tewane is located 40 km north of Mahalapye, and it has a primary school. The population was 126 in 2001 census.

References

Populated places in Central District (Botswana)
Villages in Botswana